Conrad Seth Cardinal (born March 30, 1942) is an American former professional baseball pitcher who appeared in six games in Major League Baseball for the Houston Colt .45s in . Born in Brooklyn and of Jewish descent, he attended Valley Stream High School in Valley Stream, New York.

Cardinal's four-year professional career began in 1962 in the Detroit Tigers' organization. After winning 14 games in the Class D New York–Penn League that season, he was selected by Houston in the first-year player draft in November, then made the 1963 Colt .45s' 28-man early-season roster out of spring training. In his MLB debut April 11, he worked three innings of middle relief and allowed three hits and one earned run, while striking out three, against the defending National League champion San Francisco Giants. One of his strikeout victims was Willie Mays. Ten days later, he made his only big-league start against eventual 1963 NL and World Series champion Los Angeles at Dodger Stadium. But he lasted only two-thirds of an inning, allowing five runs (three earned) on three hits and three bases on balls, and was tagged with the 11–3 defeat, his only career MLB decision. He worked in three more games in relief between April 23 and May 4, before he was sent to the Double-A Texas League.

Cardinal never returned to the majors. In his six appearances, he allowed 15 hits and seven bases on balls, and registered seven strikeouts, in 13 innings pitched. His minor league baseball career lasted into the 1965 season.

References

External links

1942 births
Living people
Durham Bulls players
Houston Colt .45s players
Jamestown Tigers players
Jewish American baseball players
Jewish Major League Baseball players
Major League Baseball pitchers
San Antonio Bullets players
Sportspeople from Brooklyn
Baseball players from New York City
21st-century American Jews